The 2015 Mountain West Conference women's basketball tournament will be held on March 9–13, 2015 at the Thomas & Mack Center in Las Vegas, Nevada. As with last year the top 5 seeds will get the first round bye. For the 3rd year in a row all games Mountain West Network will carry the tournament, but this year they also add the championship game to their schedule. The tournament champion will receive the Mountain West's only bid to the 2015 NCAA tournament.

Seeds
Teams are seeded by conference record, with a ties broken by record between the tied teams followed by record against the regular-season champion, if necessary.

Schedule

Bracket

References

2014–15 Mountain West Conference women's basketball season
Mountain West Conference women's basketball tournament